SMS Rostock was a light cruiser of the  built by the German Kaiserliche Marine (Imperial Navy). She had one sister ship, ; the ships were very similar to the previous s. The ship was laid down in 1911, launched in November 1912, and completed by February 1914.

Rostock served with the High Seas Fleet as a leader of torpedo boat flotillas for the duration of her career. She served with the screens for the battlecruisers of I Scouting Group during operations against the British coast and the Battle of Dogger Bank. She was assigned to the screen for the battle fleet during the Battle of Jutland on 31 May – 1 June 1916. She saw major action at Jutland and frequently engaged British light forces, culminating in her being torpedoed by destroyers shortly after midnight. She was taken under tow by German torpedo boats, but the following morning the cruiser  came upon the retreating ships. The Germans set scuttling charges aboard Rostock and took off the crew before Dublin arrived on the scene.

Design

She displaced  at full load. Her propulsion system consisted of two sets of Marine steam turbines driving two  propellers. They were designed to give , but reached  in service. These were powered by twelve coal-fired Marine-type water-tube boilers and two oil-fired double-ended boilers. Rostock had a crew of 18 officers and 355 enlisted men.

The ship was armed with a main battery of twelve  SK L/45 guns in single pedestal mounts. Two were placed side by side forward on the forecastle, eight were located amidships, four on either side, and two were side by side aft. They were supplied with 1,800 rounds of ammunition, for 150 shells per gun. She was also equipped with a pair of  torpedo tubes with five torpedoes submerged in the hull on the broadside. She could also carry 120 mines.

Service history
Rostock was ordered under the contract name "Ersatz " and was laid down at the Howaldtswerke shipyard in Kiel in 1911. She was launched on 12 November 1912; at her launching, she was christened by the mayor of Rostock, Dr. Magnus Maßmann. After completing Fitting-out work, the ship was commissioned into the High Seas Fleet on 5 February 1914. Following her commissioning in February 1914, Rostock was assigned as a torpedo boat flotilla leader with the High Seas Fleet.

World War I
On 24 January 1915, Rostock formed part of the support for Admiral Franz von Hipper battlecruisers in I Scouting Group during a sortie to destroy British light forces known to be operating near the Dogger Bank. The ship steamed with three other light cruisers and nineteen torpedo boats. Rostock and several of the torpedo boats were tasked with screening the port flank of the battlecruiser squadron. The German group encountered five British battlecruisers, resulting in the Battle of Dogger Bank, during which the armored cruiser  was sunk. Rostock participated in the bombardment of Yarmouth and Lowestoft on 24 April 1916, and as part of the screen for I Scouting Group. While the battlecruisers bombarded Lowestoft, Rostock and five other cruisers engaged the Harwich Force. Shortly thereafter, the battlecruisers intervened and forced the Harwich Force to withdraw. The German squadron then broke off and returned to port.

Battle of Jutland

Rostock also participated in the Battle of Jutland, on 31 May 1916. She served as the leader of the torpedo boat flotillas, flying the flag of Kommodore Andreas Michelsen. The flotilla was tasked with screening for the battle squadrons of the High Seas Fleet. As the German fleet reached the engagement between the British and German battlecruiser squadrons at 17:30, a pair of destroyers,  and  attempted to attack the German battle line. Rostock and a number of the battleships engaged the destroyers, which were both disabled by the heavy German fire. The battleships destroyed Nestor and Nicator and their crews were picked up by German torpedo boats.

At 19:32, Rostock and several torpedo boats crossed through the German line and began to lay a smoke screen to cover the withdrawal of the German fleet. Some twenty minutes later, Michelsen detached several torpedo boats to assist the badly damaged battlecruiser . By the time the German fleet had assumed its night cruising formation, Rostock fell in with the light cruisers of IV Scouting Group on the port side of the fleet. Shortly before midnight, Rostock and IV Scouting Group came into contact with the 2nd Light Cruiser Squadron. Shortly after midnight, the British 4th Destroyer Flotilla attacked the German line, where Rostock was positioned. She joined the cannonade directed against the destroyers as they pressed home their attack. The destroyers launched several torpedoes at the Germans, forcing Rostock and the other cruisers to turn away to avoid them; this pointed the ships directly at the battleships in I Battle Squadron. Rostock successfully passed through the formation, but the cruiser  was rammed by one of the battleships and disabled.

In the chaos of the night engagement, Rostocks search lights illuminated the destroyer . Gunfire from Rostock and the battleships  and  smothered the British destroyer; although heavily damaged, she managed to limp back to port. One torpedo struck Rostock at 1:30, though it is unknown which destroyer launched it. Rostock was also hit by three  shells, probably from the destroyer Broke. The pair was subsequently joined by the destroyers V71 and V73, which had been detached from the flotilla to escort Rostock back to port.

At around 03:55 on 1 June, the four German ships encountered the British cruiser . The three destroyers went alongside the crippled cruiser and evacuated her crew, while flashing the first two letters of the British signal challenge. Smoke screens were laid to obscure the identity of the German warships. After about ten minutes, S54 departed with Rostocks crew aboard, while V71 and V73 remained. Scuttling charges had been set in the cruiser, but to ensure Rostock sank faster, the two destroyers fired a total of three torpedoes into the ship. Rostock sank bow-first at approximately 04:25, after which V71 and V73 made for Horns Reef at high speed. Of Rostocks crew, 14 men were killed and 6 were wounded during the battle. In the course of the battle, Rostock fired some 500 rounds of 10.5 cm ammunition, more than any other German ship.

Notes

References

Further reading
 

Karlsruhe-class cruisers
Ships built in Kiel
1912 ships
World War I cruisers of Germany
Ships sunk at the Battle of Jutland
Maritime incidents in 1916